Pantelamprus is a genus of moths of the family Xyloryctidae.

Species
 Pantelamprus fimbripedana (Walker, 1863)
 Pantelamprus staudingeri Christoph, 1882

References

Xyloryctidae
Xyloryctidae genera